An election was held on 27 February 2018 in 59 out of 60 constituencies of the Legislative Assembly of Nagaland. The scheduled election in Northern Angami II constituency did not take place as only incumbent MLA Neiphiu Rio was nominated and was therefore declared elected unopposed. The counting of votes took place on 3 March 2018.

Background 
The tenure of the Nagaland Legislative Assembly ended on 13 March 2018. On 22 Jan 2018, former CM KL Chishi joined the BJP along with 12 other leaders and former lawmakers, including former Independent legislator Jacob Zhimomi, at an event in Dimapur.

11 parties issued a statement calling for the postponement of the polls.

The BJP-led National Democratic Alliance and the ruling Naga Peoples' Front dissolved their electoral alliance prior to the election.  The BJP instead chose to form an alliance with the newly formed Nationalist Democratic Progressive Party, led by former CM Neiphiu Rio.

Schedule 
The dates of the election were announced on 18 January 2018.

Exit polls

Result
9 parties registered to contest the election, as well as a further 11 independent candidates. Lok Sabha MP and former Chief Minister Neiphiu Rio of the Nationalist Democratic Progressive Party was declared elected uncontested in the Northern Angami II constituency after no other candidate was nominated against him.

Constituency-wise results

Government Formation

Neiphiu Rio, the leader of the Nationalist Democratic Progressive Party was sworn in as the Chief Minister of Nagaland on 8 March 2018. The ministry had 12 Cabinet ministers including the Chief Minister. 4 incumbents including the Chief Minister belong to the Nationalist Democratic Progressive Party, while 6 ministers including the Deputy Chief Minister belong to the Bharatiya Janata Party. 1 minister is a Naga People's Front MLA .1 minister is an Independent MLA. NPP party two MLA's and one JD(U) MLA merged with Nationalist Democratic Progressive Party

See also 
 Elections in India
 2018 elections in India

References

External links
 Election Commission of India
 Nagaland Legislative Assembly

2018 in Nagaland
Nagaland
2018
2018